Orlando Ribeiro may refer to:

 Orlando Ribeiro (geographer) (1911-1997), Portuguese geographer and historian
 Orlando Ribeiro (footballer) (born 1967), Brazilian football coach and former footballer